Scrobipalpula caustonae is a moth in the family Gelechiidae. It was described by Bernard Landry in 2010. It is found on the Galápagos Islands.

Etymology
The species is named for Charlotte Causton, former head of Charles Darwin Research Station's Department of Invertebrates.

References

Scrobipalpula
Moths described in 2010